Pir Zanuk (also Romanized as Pīr Zanūk and Pīrzenūk; also known as Bīrzanūk) is a village in Fakhrud Rural District, Qohestan District, Darmian County, South Khorasan Province, Iran. At the 2006 census, its population was 89, in 28 families.

References 

Populated places in Darmian County